Marry Me, Marry You is a 2021 Philippine drama romantic comedy television series broadcast by Kapamilya Channel directed by Dwein Baltazar and Jojo Saguin, it stars Paulo Avelino and Janine Gutierrez. The series premiered on the network's Primetime Bida evening block, Jeepney TV, A2Z, and TV5's Todo Max Primetime Singko, and worldwide via The Filipino Channel from September 13, 2021, to January 21, 2022, on Monday to Friday at 9:30 PM and move on 8:45 PM on its new season and new timeslot, replacing Init sa Magdamag and was replaced by The Broken Marriage Vow.

Premise
The story is about a couple who navigates the traditional expectations attached to marriage that extends beyond one's partner including their family and friends.

Cast and characters

Main cast
 Paulo Avelino as Andrei P. Legaspi / Andrei M. Legaspi
 Janine Gutierrez as Camille Miraflor-Legaspi
 Cherry Pie Picache as Elvira "Elvie" T. Manansala-Zamora
 Vina Morales as Marvi de Luna-Jacinto
 Sunshine Dizon as Maria Pauleene "Paula" Justiniano
 Edu Manzano as Emilio V. Legaspi

Supporting cast
 Jake Ejercito as Cedric Banez
 Teresa Loyzaga as Laviña B. Cruz / Laviña O. Madrigal
 Lito Pimentel as Victor Zamora
 Joko Diaz as Aljo Nikolas Justiniano
 Jett Pangan as Michael "Myke" Jacinto
 Iana Bernandez as Patricia Francisco
 EJ Jallorina as Dexie Salazar
 Adrian Lindayag as Kelvin M. Zamora
 Fino Herrera as Luke Dionisio
 Keann Johnson as Xavier C. Legaspi
 Meann Espinosa as Toni Lim
 Mariella Laurel as Bella Justiano
 Luis Vera Perez as Jomer D. Jacinto
 Angelica Lao as Jamie D. Jacinto
 Analain Salvador as Koleene Justiniano
 Joel Saracho as Martin Mercado
 Pontri Bernardo as Ben Francisco

Guest cast
 Lotlot de Leon as Judith Miraflor
 Ana Abad Santos as Luisa Banez
 Arabella del Rosario as Nicki Banez
 Franco Daza as Atty. Ricardo Asunción
 Lao Rodriguez as Jason Arcadio
 Jenny Miller as Grace Dionisio
 Criza Taa as Erika Dionisio
 Darren Espanto as Wedding singer

Production
Filming for the drama started in May 2021 with a lock-in taping set-up.

Original soundtrack

Timeslot change & International Broadcast
The show originally aired weeknights at 9:30 PM PST. However, on November 15, 2021, after Huwag Kang Mangamba ended along with the premiere of Season 2, the show's timeslot was changed to 8:45 PM, with Viral Scandal taking over the show's previous timeslot.

This was the first television show starred by former GMA's actors Sunshine Dizon and Janine Gutierrez.

The show is premiering in free TV channel TVS in Malaysia.

Notes

References

External links
 
 

ABS-CBN drama series
Philippine romantic comedy television series
2021 Philippine television series debuts
2022 Philippine television series endings
Television series by Dreamscape Entertainment Television
Television shows set in the Philippines
Filipino-language television shows
Adultery in television